Charles Hardwick (10 September 1817 – 8 July 1889) was an English antiquary, known for his writings related to Lancashire.

Life
The son of an innkeeper at Preston, Lancashire, he was born there on 10 September 1817. He was apprenticed to a printer, but on the expiration of his bond he devoted himself to art, and practised as a portrait-painter in Preston. Having joined the Odd Fellows he took part in the reform of the Manchester Unity, and was elected grand-master of the order.

Hardwick was a vice-president of the Manchester Literary Club, of which he was a founder. The original idea for the club, founded in 1862, has been attributed to Hardwick, Joseph Chattwood and Edwin Waugh.

Hardwick died at Manchester on 8 July 1889.

Works
Hardwick's major works were:

 History of the borough of Preston and its Environs in the county of Lancaster, Preston, 1857
 The History, present position, and social importance of Friendly Societies, London, 1859 and 1869
 Traditions, Superstitions, and Folk-Lore (chiefly Lancashire and the North of England:) their affinity to others . . . their eastern origin and mythical significance, Manchester, 1872
 On some antient Battlefields in Lancashire and their historical, legendary, and aesthetic associations, Manchester, 1882

Hardwick also was editor of Country Words: a North of England Magazine of Literature, Science, and Art, 17 numbers, Manchester, 1866-67. Ben Brierley assisted him with the magazine.

Notes

Attribution

External links
 
 

1817 births
1889 deaths
English antiquarians
English male journalists
Writers from Preston, Lancashire
19th-century British journalists
19th-century English male writers